Kris De Wree (born 21 May 1981) is a Belgian football player who plays as a right midfielder or right winger. He has previously played for  Lierse SK. He signed a contract at Roda JC from Kerkrade after leaving K.F.C. Germinal Beerschot, where he spent eight years of his career. In the 2005 Belgian Cup final, De Wree scored the winning goal for Germinal against Club Brugge KV.

Honours

Club
Beerschot A.C.
 Belgian Cup: 2004–05

References

1981 births
Living people
Belgian footballers
K.S.K. Beveren players
Beerschot A.C. players
Roda JC Kerkrade players
Lierse S.K. players
Belgian Pro League players
Eredivisie players
Belgian expatriate footballers
Expatriate footballers in the Netherlands
Belgian expatriate sportspeople in the Netherlands
People from Sint-Gillis-Waas
Association football midfielders
Association football defenders
Footballers from East Flanders